Wills Mountain State Park is an undeveloped public recreation area on Wills Mountain overlooking the Cumberland Narrows in Allegany County, Maryland. The state park occupies  on the northwest edge of the City of Cumberland. It is under the control of the Maryland Department of Natural Resources.

History
From 1899 until 1930, Wills Mountain was the site of the Wills Mountain Inn, a mansion featuring 46 bedrooms with private baths and a grand ballroom that was initially used as a fraternal clubhouse and informal country club. In 1902, the property was sold to Dr. Henry Fry for conversion to a sanatorium. The property burned down in 1930.

In 1952, the Maryland State Planning Commission encouraged the state to create an historic preserve on Wills Mountain through the purchase of 400 acres, the improvement of a private road that ascended to the summit, and development of picnicking and sightseeing facilities to take advantage of the natural beauty of the overlook. The park was created in 1998 when the state purchased 350 acres from Carl G. Valentine for $160,000, and George and Joan Henderson donated another 51 acres. The 2009 Maryland Land Preservation, Parks and Recreation Plan described the parcel as "virtually inaccessible" and "sensitive" with "no uses ... official or informal." The state began purchasing adjoining parcels in 2017 with the intention of creating public access to the site.

References

External links
Wills Mountain State Park Protected Planet

State parks of Maryland
State parks of the Appalachians
Parks in Allegany County, Maryland
Parks in Cumberland, MD-WV-PA
Protected areas established in 1998
1998 establishments in Maryland